Port Regis School is a co-educational preparatory school located in 140 acres of parkland on the Dorset-Wiltshire border in southern England, situated between the towns of Shaftesbury and Gillingham.

In 2009 Which school? said of Port Regis that it had "long been a market leader in the prep school world" while the Tatler Schools Guide 2014 described it as "a prep school with public-school facilities (...) Simply the shiniest, best-equipped prep around". In 2014 the Independent Schools Inspectorate judged Port Regis to be 'excellent' in all nine inspected categories.

History
The original school was founded by Alfred Praetorius in 1881 in Weymouth Street, London. A few years later it moved to Folkestone and in 1921 to Kingsgate, Broadstairs, in the grounds of which stood an ancient arch, erected by Earl Holland to commemorate a chance landing by Charles II in 1683. This provided the name of the School: Port Regis, "Gate of the King".

In the 1930s, while at Broadstairs, the school was unusual in offering scholarships for the sons of physicians.

In September 1943 Port Regis was evacuated to a wing of Bryanston School in Blandford. After a brief stay at the Earl of Verulam's home at Gorhambury, the School moved in 1947 to Motcombe Park, one mile (1.6 km) from Shaftesbury in Dorset, where it has been ever since.

In 1972 the freehold of the property was acquired. More recent developments include the building of the Jowett sports hall, opened in 1980 by Anne, Princess Royal. The Centenary Hall was opened in 1984.

On 22 February 1991, the Queen's Hall, which houses a heated swimming pool and competition-standard gymnasium with sunken trampoline, was opened by Queen Elizabeth II and Prince Philip, Duke of Edinburgh, while their grandchildren Peter and Zara Phillips were at the school.

The three most recently constructed school buildings are Cunningham Hall (1992), Farrington Music School (2003) and the JM Upward Academic Centre (2008).

Boarding houses
The Prep school and Pre-Prep together consist of around 360 pupils, with roughly half of them boys and half of them girls. There are four boarding houses:

 Grosvenor (girls aged 11 to 13)
 Huxley (girls aged 7 to 11)
 Prichard Hall (boys aged 11 to 13)
 Talbot (boys aged 7 to 11)

Staff and governors
Since 1933, Port Regis has had six headmasters: John Upward (1933-1968), David Prichard (1969-1993), Peter Dix (1994-2010), Benedict Dunhill (2010-2015), Stephen Ilett (2016-2020), and Titus Mills (2021-).

David Prichard, headmaster from 1969 to 1993, chaired the National Conference for Governors, Bursars and Heads from 1981 to 1993 and simultaneously chaired the Independent Association of Preparatory Schools in 1989–90.

The abstract painter Roger Hilton taught art at the school from 1946 to 1947.

Lt. General Sir Hugh Cunningham was chairman of the school's governing body from 1982 to 1994.

Notable former pupils (Old Portregians)

 Kwame Anthony Appiah, British philosopher, cultural theorist, novelist and professor at New York University
 Sir Louis Blom-Cooper, barrister, author, and chairman of the Press Council
 Bo Bruce, singer and songwriter
 Myles Burnyeat, Emeritus Professor of Ancient Philosophy at the University of Cambridge
 Max Clark, professional rugby player at Bath Rugby
 Jasper Conran, designer
 Sebastian Conran, designer and member of the UK Design Council
 Tom Conran, restaurateur
 Paul Cox, artist and illustrator whose works have been commissioned by the Folio Society, Royal Mail and several newspapers and current affairs magazines
 Rebecca Deacon, private secretary to Catherine, Duchess of Cambridge
 John Deeker, pyrotechnician who designed the fireworks display for the 1981 royal wedding of Charles and Diana
 Hilary Dresser, rower for the Great Britain team at the 1992 Summer Olympics in Barcelona.
 Adetomiwa Edun, actor who starred in the British TV series Merlin
 Luke Evans (politician), Member of Parliament for Bosworth (UK Parliament constituency) from 2019.
 Prince Rashid bin El Hassan, member of the Jordanian Royal Family
 Jonathan Gathorne-Hardy, biographer, historian and novelist
 Nick Greenstock, English international rugby player
 John Gunter, Emmy Award-winning set designer
 Adrian Heath, artist
 George Hurst, Chief Conductor of the BBC Philharmonic Orchestra
 Daisy Lewis, actress who starred in Downton Abbey and Doctor Who
 Felix Lowe, author and cycling journalist at Eurosport and France 24
 Hugh Massingberd, journalist and genealogist, known as the father of the modern obituary
 Amelia Maughan, bronze medal-winning swimmer at the 2014 Commonwealth Games
 Tim Payne, English international rugby player
 Peter Phillips, son of Anne, Princess Royal
 Oliver Pritchett, journalist and humourist at the Daily Telegraph and Sunday Telegraph
 Henry Pyrgos, Scottish international rugby player
 Geoffrey Rootes, 2nd Baron Rootes, industrialist and Chairman of Chrysler UK
 Bruce Sharman, film producer and production manager/supervisor of Star Wars (1977) and The Empire Strikes Back (1980)
 John Stephen, founder of the prestigious Chinawhite nightclub in central London
 Zara Tindall, daughter of Anne, Princess Royal
 Lloyd Wallace, gold medal-winning aerial skier

References

External links
 

Preparatory schools in Dorset
Boarding schools in Dorset
Educational institutions established in 1881
1881 establishments in England